Kathrin Freudelsperger (born 8 February 1987 in Graz, Austria) is an Austrian former competitive figure skater. She is the 2006 Merano Cup champion, 2007 International Challenge Cup silver medalist, and 2007 Austrian national champion. She retired from competition in fall 2008. She majored in law at Karl-Franzens University in Graz.

Programs

Competitive highlights 
JGP: Junior Grand Prix

References

External links

Navigation

Austrian female single skaters
1987 births
Living people
Sportspeople from Graz